Janine Charrat (24 July 1924 – 29 August 2017) was a French dancer and choreographer. She appeared in Ballerina at the age of 12, and went on to choreograph over 50 ballets. She was an officer of the Legion of Honour.

Filmography 
 1938: La Mort du cygne, by Jean Benoît-Lévy
 1952: La Jeune Fille aux allumettes, by Jean Benoît-Lévy
 1959: Les Algues, by Louis Bertrand Castelli
 1962: Schéhérazade by Pierre Gaspard-Huit, with Anna Karina and Gil Vidal, choreography by Janine Charrat
 2001: Janine Charrat, l'instinct de la danse, by Luc Riolon and Rachel Seddoh

References

1924 births
2017 deaths
People from Grenoble
20th-century French ballet dancers
French choreographers
Officiers of the Légion d'honneur